Kiss Them for Me is a 1945 Broadway production based on Frederic Wakeman Sr.'s 1944 novel entitled Shore Leave. The play ran for 110 performances. Opening at the Belasco Theatre on March 20, 1945, it closed at the Fulton Theatre on June 23 of the same year.

Plot
The play, set in The St. Mark Hotel and a naval hospital in San Francisco, centers on three navy war heroes who have been sent on a "vacation".  The morale-building trip, which is really a public relations effort, is overseen by an officer who tries to get the three to make speeches at shipyard plants, but they just want to find a good time.

Opening night production credits
Produced by John H. Moses and Mark Hanna
Script Written by Luther Davis; based on Shore Leave by Frederic Wakeman Sr.
Directed by Herman Shumlin
Scenic Design by Frederick Fox

Opening night cast
Robert Allen ... Turnbill
George Cory ... Chief
Jayne Cotter ... Gwynneth
Edward Crandall ... Lt. Commander Wallace
Richard Davis ... Mac
Amy Douglass ... Chief Nurse
Paul Ford ... Mr. Hardy
Harold Grau ... Tailor
Judy Holliday ... Alice
Douglas Jones ... Ensign
Virginia Kaye ... Nurse Wilinski
Dennis King, Jr. ... Mississip
George Mathews ... Gunner
John McGovern ... F. Neilson
Patricia Quinn O'Hara ... Mrs. Hardy
Daniel Petrie ... Charlie
Dudley Sadler ... Hedrick
Sonya Stokowski ... WAC
Richard Widmark ... Crewson

Adaptations
 Kiss Them for Me, 1957 comedy film starring Cary Grant and Jayne Mansfield, directed by Stanley Donen.

References

External links
 

1945 plays
Broadway plays
Plays based on novels
American plays adapted into films
Plays about World War II
Plays set in California
San Francisco in fiction